Beaubassin East was an incorporated rural community in Westmorland County, New Brunswick, Canada. It held rural community status prior to 2023.

History

The rural community was incorporated on May 8, 1995 from the Local Service Districts of Boudreau West, Grand Barachois, Haute-Aboujagane, and Saint-André & LeBlanc Office, and portions of the parishes of Botsford, Sackville, and Shediac. It completely surrounded the village of Cap-Pelé.

Beaubassin East was divided into six wards, numbered counterclockwise from its eastern boundary.
 Ward 1 included Bas-Cap-Pelé, Petit-Cap, Portage, and Shemogue
 Ward 2 included Saint-André-LeBlanc
 Ward 3 included Grand-Barachois
 Ward 4 included Boudreau-Ouest
 Ward 5 included Haute-Aboujagane
 Ward 6 included Cormier-Village

In 2006, Trois-Ruisseaux became part of Beaubassin East.

On 1 January 2023, Beaubassin East amalgamated with Cap-Pelé to form the new town of Cap-Acadie. The constituent communities' names remain in official use.

Demographics 

Notable people

See also
List of rural communities in New Brunswick
 Greater Shediac

References

Communities in Westmorland County, New Brunswick
Former rural communities in New Brunswick